Helicia albiflora is a species of plant in the family Proteaceae. It is endemic to Papua New Guinea.  It is threatened by habitat loss.

References

Flora of Papua New Guinea
albiflora
Near threatened plants
Taxonomy articles created by Polbot